George Albert Holmes was an English professional footballer who played as an outside left in the Football League for Nottingham Forest and Chesterfield Town, in the Scottish League for Heart of Midlothian and in the Southern League for Coventry City. He was a member of the Nottingham Forest squad which toured Argentina and Uruguay in 1905.

Personal life 
Holmes served as a private in the Football Battalion of the Middlesex Regiment during the First World War.

Career statistics

References

1885 births
Year of death missing
Footballers from Mansfield
English footballers
Association football outside forwards
Mansfield Town F.C. players
Nottingham Forest F.C. players
Chesterfield F.C. players
Nelson F.C. players
Mansfield Mechanics F.C. players
Coventry City F.C. players
Heart of Midlothian F.C. players
Portsmouth F.C. players
English Football League players
Scottish Football League players
Southern Football League players
British Army personnel of World War I
Middlesex Regiment soldiers
Place of death missing
Military personnel from Nottinghamshire